Anthony Clark is an American actor and comedian who starred in the television series Yes, Dear, in which he played the character Greg Warner.

Early life
Clark was born in Lynchburg, Virginia. His father was a factory worker and his mother owned a general store. His parents divorced when he was five.  When he was 12, the family moved to a tobacco farm 50 miles south to Gladys, Virginia, where his stepfather lived. Clark was named College Entertainer of the Year while studying at Emerson College. Clark graduated from Emerson in 1986 with a degree in mass communications. After college, Clark broke into stand-up comedy, performing gigs at Los Angeles comedy clubs.

Career
Clark began his career as a stand-up comedian. Clark was a feature on a 1995 HBO young comedians special hosted by Garry Shandling along with Dave Chappelle, Dave Attell and Louis C.K.

Before landing a regular starring television role, Clark appeared in several small film roles such as a supporting role as "Billy" in Peter Bogdanovich's The Thing Called Love starring River Phoenix, Samantha Mathis, and Dermot Mulroney; and as Paul, the flamboyant hotel barber in 1996's The Rock. In 1995 and 1996, he also had a recurring role on the sitcom Ellen.

His first starring role was in the short-lived television comedy series Boston Common. He then appeared in another short-lived series as a main cast member in Soul Man.

In 2000, Clark landed the role of Greg Warner in the television comedy Yes, Dear. For this role, he was nominated for a Young Artist Award (along with co-star Jean Louisa Kelly as the Most Popular Mom & Dad in a Television Series) and a Prism Award. Along with Mike O'Malley, his Yes, Dear co-star, he appears in Alan Jackson's 2005 music video for "The Talkin' Song Repair Blues". In March 2006, CBS cancelled Yes, Dear after 6 seasons, when Clark was hired to host NBC's Last Comic Standing.

In 2011, opposite Missi Pyle and John Michael Higgins, Clark starred as Jack Schumacher in the comedy My Uncle Rafael.

Filmography
Films

Television

References

External links

Year of birth missing (living people)
Living people
20th-century American male actors
21st-century American male actors
Male actors from Virginia
American male comedians
American male television actors
American stand-up comedians
Emerson College alumni
People from Lynchburg, Virginia
Comedians from Virginia
20th-century American comedians
21st-century American comedians